Pseudophaloe stenoxantha is a moth in the family Erebidae. It was described by Hering in 1925. It is found in Colombia.

References

Moths described in 1925
Pseudophaloe